Furtuna Zegergish (born 1989) is an Eritrean long-distance runner who specializes in the half marathon.

Achievements

Personal bests
5000 metres : 15:37.14 min (2009)
10,000 metres : 33:24.87 min (2007)
Half marathon : 1:09:41 hrs (2009)

References

1989 births
Living people
Eritrean female long-distance runners
Athletes (track and field) at the 2007 All-Africa Games
African Games competitors for Eritrea